The women's discus throw event at the 2013 Summer Universiade was held on 8 July.

Medalists

Results

Final

References 
Results

Discus
2013 in women's athletics
2013